The Sas dles Nü is a mountain in the Dolomites near La Val, South Tyrol, Italy.

References 
 Alpenverein South Tyrol

External links 

Mountains of the Alps
Mountains of South Tyrol
Dolomites